Tessie is a 1925 American silent comedy drama film directed by Dallas M. Fitzgerald and starring May McAvoy, Robert Agnew, and Lee Moran.

Plot
As described in a film magazine review, a young woman who works as a cigar counter clerk in a hotel is abandoned by her sweetheart when he graduates from a mechanic’s job to a sales position. She accepts the attentions of a rich youth in a spirit of revenge directed toward her former suitor. The youth thrashes the ex-mechanic and elopes with the young woman,  who is well enough pleased with the outcome of her two romances.

Cast

References

Bibliography
 Munden, Kenneth White. The American Film Institute Catalog of Motion Pictures Produced in the United States, Part 1. University of California Press, 1997.

External links
 

1925 films
1925 comedy-drama films
American silent feature films
Films directed by Dallas M. Fitzgerald
American black-and-white films
Arrow Film Corporation films
1920s English-language films
1920s American films
Silent American comedy-drama films